Corymbia chartacea is a species of small tree with a weeping habit that is endemic to the Top End of the Northern Territory. It has thick, rough bark on the trunk and branches, a crown of sessile, broadly heart-shaped to broadly elliptical leaves arranged in opposite pairs, flower buds in groups of three or seven, pink or white flowers and urn-shaped to shortened spherical fruit.

Description
Flowering has been observed in February, May and August and the flowers are pink or white.

Taxonomy and naming
Corymbia chartacea was first formally described in 1995 by Kenneth Hill and Lawrence Alexander Sidney Johnson in the journal Telopea. The specific epithet (chartacea) is from the Latin word chartaceus meaning "papery", referring to the texture of the leaves.

Distribution and habitat
This eucalypt grows as an understorey species in forest and woodland and is restricted to north-western Arnhem Land and the adjacent escarpment country.

See also
 List of Corymbia species

References

chartacea
Myrtales of Australia
Flora of the Northern Territory
Plants described in 1995